Chittoor Assembly constituency is a constituency of Andhra Pradesh Legislative Assembly, India. It is one among 7 constituencies in Chittoor district. Arani Srinivasulu of YSR Congress Party is currently representing the constituency.

Mandals

Members of Legislative assembly

Election results

Assembly Elections 1952

Assembly Elections 2014

Assembly Elections 2019

See also

 Chittoor

References

Assembly constituencies of Andhra Pradesh
Chittoor